Durham Technical Community College (Durham Tech) is a public community college in Durham, North Carolina. The college serves Northern Durham County at its Northern Durham Center, and in Orange County at its Orange County Campus completed in 2008.

Durham Tech serves nearly 20,000 students with curriculum and continuing education offerings. It offers career programs leading to more than 100 degrees, certificates, and diplomas and university transfer programs. Durham Tech is a charter member of the North Carolina Community College System and is accredited by the Southern Association of Colleges and Schools.

, the college had nearly 500 full-time and part-time faculty members and 3,900 matriculated students. A large portion of Durham Tech students are part-time. To give them flexibility, the college has a large distance education program, offering numerous online courses and hybrid courses.

History
On September 5, 1961, the institution was founded as Durham Industrial Education Center. On March 30, 1965, the institution changed its name to Durham Technical Institute, at the specification of the State Board of Education. On July 22, 1986, the institution changed its name to Durham Technical Community College, when the North Carolina General Assembly approved Durham Tech's request to add a university transfer program.

Presidents and directors
 1961–1975: Harold K. Collins
 1975–1980: John Crumpton 
 November 1980–December 2007: Phail Wynn, Jr.
 January 2008–June 2020: Bill Ingram
 July 2020–present: John B. Buxton

Notable alumni 
 Crystal Mangum - false accuser in the Duke lacrosse case and convicted murderer.
 Elizabeth A. Fenn - 2015 Pulitzer Prize in History winner and Chair of History Department at the University of Colorado at Boulder

References

External links
 Official website

 
Education in Durham County, North Carolina
Education in Orange County, North Carolina
North Carolina Community College System colleges
Universities and colleges in the Research Triangle
Vocational schools in the United States
Universities and colleges in Durham, North Carolina
Educational institutions established in 1961
Universities and colleges accredited by the Southern Association of Colleges and Schools
1961 establishments in North Carolina